Trumaine Washington (born June 10, 1995) is a professional gridiron football defensive back for the Orlando Guardians of the XFL. He played for Toronto Argonauts, Edmonton Elks, and Calgary Stampeders of the Canadian Football League (CFL).

College career
Washington played college football for the Louisville Cardinals from 2014 to 2017.

Professional career

Toronto Argonauts
Washington signed with the Toronto Argonauts as a free agent on May 21, 2018 and was assigned to the practice roster following training camp. He was promoted to the active roster for the July 21, 2018 game versus the Winnipeg Blue Bombers and earned his first start on August 2, 2018. He recorded his first professional interception and touchdown on September 22, 2018 against the Saskatchewan Roughriders. Over two seasons, he played in 25 regular season games recording 56 defensive tackles, five interceptions, and one touchdown. As a pending free agent in 2020, he was released during the free agency negotiation window on February 7, 2020.

Edmonton Eskimos / Elks
Washington signed with the Edmonton Eskimos on February 11, 2020. However, he did not play in 2020 due to the cancellation of the 2020 CFL season. He signed a contract extension with the team on December 30, 2020. He played in all 14 regular season games in 2021 for the newly named Edmonton Elks where he had 55 defensive tackles, five interceptions, one forced fumble, and one touchdown. He became a free agent upon the expiry of his contract on February 8, 2022.

Ottawa Redblacks
On February 10, 2022, it was announced that Washington had signed with the Ottawa Redblacks. After two preseason games with the Redblacks, he was released on June 5, 2022.

Calgary Stampeders
After being released by the Redblacks, Washington signed a one-year contract with the Calgary Stampeders on June 15, 2022. He played in 12 regular season games where he had 42 defensive tackles, two interceptions, and one touchdown. As a pending free agent during the following off-season, Washington was released on February 6, 2023.

Orlando Guardians
Washington signed with the Orlando Guardians of the XFL on February 15, 2023.

References

External links
Calgary Stampeders bio

1995 births
Living people
American football defensive backs
Canadian football defensive backs
Players of American football from Miami
Louisville Cardinals football players
Toronto Argonauts players
Edmonton Elks players
Ottawa Redblacks players
Calgary Stampeders players
Players of Canadian football from Miami
Orlando Guardians players